Sikasso Cercle is one of seven administrative subdivision of the Sikasso Region of southern Mali. The capital is the town of Sikasso.

The cercle is divided into the urban commune of Sikasso and 42 rural communes:

Benkadi
Blendio
Danderesso
Dembela
Dialakoro
Diomaténé
Dogoni
Doumanaba
Fama
Farakala
Finkolo
Finkolo Ganadougou
Gongasso
Kabarasso
Kaboïla
Kafouziéla
Kapala
Kapolondougou
Kignan
Kléla
Kofan
Kolokoba
Koumankou
Kouoro
Kourouma
Lobougoula
Miniko
Miria
Missirikoro
N'Tjikouna
Natien
Niéna
Nongo-Souala
Pimperna
Sanzana
Sokourani-Missirikoro
Tella
Tiankadi
Wateni
Zanférébougou
Zangaradougou
Zaniéna

Cities and populated places 
Sikasso
Ténétou

References

Cercles of Mali
Sikasso Region